Merry Arizona Two: Desert Stars Shine at Christmas is the second Christmas album released by United Cerebral Palsy, a leading service provider and advocate for children and adults with disabilities, including cerebral palsy.

Amongst those who contributed to the 96's collection of Christmas carols with proceeds going to multiple sclerosis featured such Arizona's artists as Alice Cooper, CeCe Peniston, Emilio Castillo, Turning Point, and The Kingston Trio.

Track listing 

 Additional notes
 "Angels We Have Heard on High" was previously released on Indio Records
 "Little Drummer Boy" was previously released on New Haven Records
 "I'll Be Home for Christmas" was previously released by Sahnas Music
 "The Spirit of Christmas" was previously released on Rowdy Records

Credits and personnel
 Otto D'Agnolo - producer, arranger, engineer
 Art Dixie - arranger, piano, keyboards, drum programming, producer
 Arthur Thompson - arranger, vocal arranger, drum programming, producer
 CeCe Peniston - vocal arranger, lead vocal
 Alice Cooper - lead vocal
 Glen Campbell - lead vocal

 Jeff Kollman - guitar
 Kevin Stoller - arranger, piano, keyboards, producer
 Bob Willocks - bass
 Harvey Mason - drums
 Clarke Rigsby - engineer, producer
 Todd Chuba - percussion
 Jerry Donato - saxophone
 Al Ortiz - back vocal, guitar, bass
 Michael Florio - back vocal, drums, percussion
 Claudia Bloom - piano, keyboards
 Khani Cole - lead vocal
 John Willis - acoustic guitar
 Bergen White - arranger
 Jana King - back vocal
 Jon Ivey - back vocal
 Lisa Silver - back vocal
 Lura Foster - back vocal
 Toby Parrish -bagpipes
 David Hungate - bass
 Owen Hale - drums
 Dan Huff - electric guitar
 Warren Peterson - engineer
 Larry Jefferies - engineer assistant
 Robert Charles - engineer assistant
 Jim Horne - flute
 Tom McAninch - french horn
 Cynthia Wyatt - harp
 Shane Keister - keyboards
 Booby Taylor - oboe
 Farrell Morris - percussion
 Glen Campbell - producer
 Ken Hardling - producer
 Nashville String Machine - strings
 Dennis Good - trombone
 Ernie Collins - bass trombone
 Dan Oxley - trumpet
 Don Sheffield - trumpet
 Richard Steffern - trumpet
 Demitri Sahnas - bass, engineer, producer
 Bruce Stodola - drums

 Thano Sahnas - engineer, guitar
 Michael Broening - keyboards
 John Herrera - percussion
 Turning Point - producer
 Wes Marshall - trumpet, flugelhorn
 Mario Mendivil - bass
 Steve Hargrave - drums
 David Robinson - guitar
 Jolly Demis - writer
 Nick Jones- bass
 Perry Senn - drums, back vocal
 Allen Abbassi - lead guitar
 Jason McGraw - rhythm guitar
 John Kinerk - vocals
 Candace D'Agnolo - assistant engineer
 Janet Green - harpsichord, tambourine, bells
 The Kingston Trio - arranger, vocals
 Tom Golden - bass
 Teri Coté - drums, cabasa, handclaps
 Jeff Dayton - producer, arranger, guitar, back vocal, tambourine, handclaps
 George Grove - vocal, banjo
 Bob Shane - vocal, guitar
 Nick Reynolds - vocal, guitar
 Sean Paddock -drums
 Ron Herndon - keyboards
 Rick Pacella - vocal, bass
 Duane Wriston - vocal, guitar
 Ol Ortiz - arranger
 Walt Richardson - arranger, vocal arranger, guitar, drums, programming
 Aria Florio - back vocal
 Erin Florio - back vocal
 Felix Sainz - bass
 Joe Morris - drums
 Emilio Santiago - percussion
 Ray Riendeau - guitar
 Marie Ravenscroft - executive producer
 Bob Carey - photography
 Georgianna D'Agnolo - assistant producer

The list of 'Merry Arizona' compilations

See also
List of artists who reached number one on the US Dance chart

References

External links 
United Cerebral Palsy Official site

1996 compilation albums
1996 Christmas albums
Christmas compilation albums